Walter Edward Grimston (16 May 1844 – 28 July 1932) was an English amateur cricketer.

He mainly played amateur matches for I Zingari but did make a single appearance in first-class cricket for Southgate against Cambridge University in 1868.  He played for I Zingari from 1864 to 1879.

He was a right-handed batsman and an occasional wicketkeeper.

His father Edward played first-class cricket, as did three of his uncles James, Robert and Francis Grimston and his cousin Lord Hyde.

References

1844 births
1932 deaths
English cricketers
English cricketers of 1826 to 1863
Southgate cricketers
People from Braintree District